Zephaniah Platt (May 27, 1735 – September 12, 1807) was an American politician and lawyer, and founder of the U.S. town of Plattsburgh, New York.

Early life
Platt was born in Huntington, Province of New York, to Zephaniah Platt (1705-1778). He was a direct descendant of Richard Platt (1603–1684), who was born in Ware, Hertfordshire, England, and settled in the Connecticut Colony.

Platt received an English education.

Career
Zephaniah Platt practiced law in Poughkeepsie, New York, and was a member of the New York Provincial Congress (1775–1777), Committee of Safety (1777), State Senate (1777–1783), Congress of the Confederation (1785 and 1786), Council of Appointment (1778 and 1781). He was a Dutchess County judge from 1781 to 1795 and delegate to the New York Constitutional Convention in 1788.

In 1788, he founded the town of Plattsburgh in New York, and moved there in 1798 to continue practicing law.  He was an originator of the Erie Canal, and was a regent of the University of the State of New York from 1791 until his death, in Plattsburgh, in 1807.

Personal life
Platt was married twice, first to Mary Hannah Davis (1741–1761) in 1756 and had two children:

 Zephaniah Platt (1756–1830)
 Hannah Comstock Platt (b. 1758)

In 1761, he married Mary Van Wyck Platt (1742–1809) and had 12 children including:

 Jonas Platt (1769–1834), who was a U.S. Representative for the 9th Congressional District of New York (1799–1801), lawyer and associate justice of the New York State Supreme Court
 Charles Z. Platt (1773–1822), who was a New York State Assemblyman for Oneida County (1807–1813) and New York State Treasurer (1813–1817)
 James Platt (1788–1870), who married Eliza Floyd, daughter of William Floyd, and had four children. After Eliza's death, he remarried twice, first to Susan Katharine Auchmuty, and secondly, as his third wife, to Sarah (née Breese) Lansing, widow of Bleeker Lansing and sister of Rear Admiral Samuel Livingston Breese and U.S. Senator Sidney Breese.

Platt owned two slaves in his lifetime, a man named "Tone" and a man named "Cato." Tone was manumitted in 1795, whereas Cato was manumitted by the Executor of his will, Jonas Platt, in 1808, four months after his death.

Descendants
Platt's grandson (son of Jonas Platt) Zephaniah Platt (1796–1871) was Michigan Attorney General.

References

External links
 

Zephaniah Platt entry at The Political Graveyard

1735 births
1807 deaths
American people of English descent
Continental Congressmen from New York (state)
18th-century American politicians
Members of the New York Provincial Congress
New York (state) lawyers
New York (state) state court judges
New York (state) state senators
People from Huntington, New York